Chitra Banerjee Divakaruni (born Chitralekha Banerjee, 1956) is an Indian-born American author, poet, and the Betty and Gene McDavid Professor of Writing at the University of Houston Creative Writing Program. Her short story collection, Arranged Marriage, won an American Book Award in 1996. Two of her novels (The Mistress of Spices and Sister of My Heart), as well as a short story (The Word Love) were adapted into films.

Divakaruni's works are largely set in India and the United States, and often focus on the experiences of South Asian immigrants. She writes for children as well as adults, and has published novels in multiple genres, including realistic fiction, historical fiction, magical realism, myth and fantasy.

Early life and education
Divakaruni was born in Calcutta, India. She received her B.A. from the University of Calcutta in 1976. In the same year, she went to the United States to attend Wright State University, where she received a master's degree. She received a PhD in English from the University of California, Berkeley in 1985 (Christopher Marlowe was the subject of her doctoral dissertation).

Career
Divakaruni put herself through graduate school by taking on odd jobs, working as a babysitter, a store clerk, a bread slicer in a bakery, a laboratory assistant at Wright State University, and a dining hall attendant at International House, Berkeley. She was a graduate teaching assistant at U.C. Berkeley. She taught in California at Foothill College and Diablo Valley College. She now lives and teaches in Texas, where she is the McDavid Professor of Creative Writing at the University of Houston Creative Writing Program.

Divakaruni is the co-founder and former president of Maitri, a helpline founded in 1991 in San Francisco for South Asian women dealing with domestic abuse. Divakaruni is on its advisory board and on the advisory board of Daya, a similar service in Houston. She has served on the board of Pratham Houston, an organisation working to bring literacy to disadvantaged Indian children, and is on their emeritus board.

Works

Fiction and poetry
Divakaruni began her writing career as a poet. Her volumes of poetry include Black Candle and Leaving Yuba City.

Her first collection of stories Arranged Marriage won an American Book Award, a PEN Josephine Miles Award, and a Bay Area Book Reviewers Award. Her major novels include The Mistress of Spices, Sister of My Heart,  Queen of Dreams, One Amazing Thing, Palace of Illusions,  Oleander Girl and Before We Visit the Goddess. She has also written a young adult fantasy series called The Brotherhood of the Conch which is located in India and draws on the culture and folklore of that region. The first book of the series, The Conch Bearer was nominated for the 2003 Bluebonnet Award. The second book of the series, The Mirror of Fire and Dreaming came out in 2005 and the third and final book of the series, Shadowland, was published in 2009.

Divakaruni's novel The Palace of Illusions, was a national best-seller for over a year in India and is a re-telling of the Indian epic The Mahabharata from Draupadi's perspective.

Divakaruni's work has been published in The Atlantic Monthly and The New Yorker, and her writing has been included in anthologies including the Best American Short Stories, the O. Henry Prize Stories, and the Pushcart Prize anthology. Her fiction has been translated into 29 languages, including Dutch, Hebrew, Indonesian, Bengali, Turkish and Japanese.

Film, television, theatre and opera
Divakaruni's novel The Mistress of Spices was released as a film of the same name in 2005. It was directed by Paul Mayeda Berges, with a script by Berges and his wife, Gurinder Chadha. Her novel Sister of my Heart was made into a television series by Suhasini Maniratnam in Tamil and aired in India, as Anbulla Snegithiye (Loving Friend). In 2018 the producers NR Pachisia und Dipankar Jojo Chaki secured the rights to a film adaption of The Palace of Illusions.

Divakaruni's story Clothes from the collection Arranged Marriage was adapted into play under the title Arranged Marriage by Peggy Shannon in 2004, 2010, and 2016.

In 2013, Divakaruni wrote the libretto to a chamber opera for Houston Grand Opera, River of Light, about the life of an Indian woman in Houston. It premiered in 2014 with original compositions by Jack Perla and was shown again in 2015 by the opera company Festival Opera, directed by Tanya Kane-Parry at the Oakland Asian Cultural Center.

The Palace of Illusions was adapted into a play named Fire and Ice: Draupadi's Story by Joe DiSabatino and performed in India under his direction. A Bollywood movie with the title Mahabharat, starring Deepika Padukone as Draupadi, is bring prepared in India based on The Palace of Illusions. The premiere was scheduled for 2021.

As of 2021, her novel One Amazing Thing has been optioned to become a Bollywood film.

Honors and awards
 1996 American Book Award (Arranged Marriage)
 1996 PEN Josephine Miles Literary Award (Arranged Marriage)
 Bay Area Book Reviewers' Award (Arranged Marriage)
 1997 Pushcart Prize (Leaving Yuba City: New and Selected Poems)
 2003 Pushcart Prize (The Lives of Strangers)
 2007 Distinguished Writer Award from the South Asian Literary Association

Publications

Fiction 
 Arranged Marriage: Stories (1995)
 The Mistress of Spices (1997)
 Sister of My Heart (1999)
 The Unknown Errors of our Lives (2001)
 The Vine of Desire (2002)
 Queen of Dreams (2004)
 The Lives of Strangers (2007)
 The Palace of Illusions: A Novel (2008)
 One Amazing Thing (2010)
 Oleander Girl (2013)
  Before We Visit the Goddess (2016)
 The Forest of Enchantments (2019)
 The Last Queen (2021)
 Independence: A Novel (2023)

Young adult and children's 
 Neela: Victory Song (2002)
 Grandma and the Great Gourd (2013) (children's picture book)

Brotherhood of the Conch series 
 The Conch Bearer (2003)
 The Mirror of Fire and Dreaming (2005)
 Shadowland (2009)

Poetry 
 The Reason for Nasturtiums, Berkeley (Berkeley Poets Workshop) 1990. 
 Black Candle. Poems About Women from India, Pakistan, and Bangladesh, Corvallis (Calyx Books) 1991. 
 Leaving Yuba City, St. Louis (Turtleback Books) 1997.

Anthologies 
 Multitude: Cross Cultural Readings for Writers (1993)
 We Too Sing America (1997)
 California Uncovered: Stories for the 21st Century (2004)

Personal life
Divakaruni lives in Houston with her husband, Murthy. She has two sons, Anand and Abhay (whose names she has used in her children's novels).

See also

 List of Indian Americans
 Indian English literature
 List of Asian American writers

References

Further reading
 Abcarian, Richard and Marvin Klotz. "Chitra Banerjee Divakaruni." In Literature: The Human Experience, 9th edition. New York: Bedford/St. Martin's, 2006: 1544.
 
 Softsky, Elizabeth. "Cross Cultural Understanding Spiced with the Indian Diaspora." Black Issues in Higher Education 14 (15):26.  18 September 1997.
 X.J. Kennedy et al. The Bedford Reader, 10th edition. New York: Bedford/St. Martin's, 2007: 446.
 Majithia, Sheetal. "Of Foreigners and Fetishes: A Reading of Recent South Asian American Fiction." Samar 14: The South Asian American Generation (Fall/Winter 2001): 52–53. Of Foreigners and Fetishes | Samar Magazine
 Newton, Pauline T. Transcultural Women of Later Twentieth Century US American Literature. Ashgate Publishing, 2005.
 Merlin, Lara. "The Mistress of Spices."  World Literature Today. University of Oklahoma. 1 January 1998.
 Johnson, Sarah Anne. "Writing outside the Lines." Writer 117(3):20 Mar 2004.
 Nelson, Emmanuel Sampath. Asian American Novelists A Bio-Bibliographical Critical Sourcebook. Westport, Conn: Greenwood Press, 2000.

External links
 
 
 
 

21st-century American novelists
Indian emigrants to the United States
American women short story writers
University of Calcutta alumni
Wright State University alumni
Bengali writers
1956 births
Living people
University of Houston faculty
University of California, Berkeley alumni
American people of Bengali descent
20th-century American novelists
American novelists of Indian descent
American women novelists
American women writers of Indian descent
American short story writers of Asian descent
American writers of Indian descent
21st-century Indian women writers
21st-century Indian writers
20th-century Indian short story writers
21st-century Indian short story writers
20th-century American short story writers
21st-century American short story writers
20th-century Indian women writers
20th-century American women writers
21st-century American women writers
20th-century Indian novelists
21st-century Indian novelists
Writers from Kolkata
Women writers from West Bengal
Novelists from West Bengal
Poets from West Bengal
PEN Oakland/Josephine Miles Literary Award winners
American Book Award winners
Novelists from Texas
American women academics